is a Fukui Railway Fukubu Line railway station located in the city of Fukui, Fukui Prefecture, Japan.

Lines

Station layout
The station consists of two ground-level side platforms connected by a level crossing. The station is unattended.

Adjacent stations

History
The station opened on June 5, 1927. The station was relocated 600 meters towards Echizen-Takefu on July 5, 1935.

Surrounding area
Although the immediate area is mostly rice fields, National Route 8 is nearby and there is some residential development.
A fitness center is located approximately 800 meters away.

See also
 List of railway stations in Japan

External links

  

Railway stations in Fukui Prefecture
Railway stations in Japan opened in 1927
Fukui Railway Fukubu Line
Fukui (city)